Vexillum macrospira is a species of sea snail, a marine gastropod mollusk, in the family Costellariidae, the ribbed miters.

References

macrospira
Gastropods described in 1853